The list of shipwrecks in June 1886 includes ships sunk, foundered, grounded, or otherwise lost during June 1886.

3 June

4 June

5 June

10 June

11 June

12 June

17 June

18 June

19 June

21 June

23 June

26 June

27 June

30 June

Unknown date

References

1886-06
Maritime incidents in June 1886